Jake McGing (born 22 May 1994) is an Australian professional footballer who plays as a right back for the Macarthur FC.

Playing career
McGing first played junior football for Macarthur Rams before he played senior football for Marconi Stallions. In February 2015, McGing signed a professional contract with A-League side Central Coast Mariners, having previously played for the Mariners' youth team. McGing made his debut for the Central Coast in a loss to Wellington Phoenix in the 2015 FFA Cup. He signed a two-year extension with the club in August 2015.

Originally a midfielder, McGing moved into centre back under Mariners coach Tony Walmsley. McGing scored his first A-League goal for the Mariners in November 2016, from a header in a draw against Newcastle Jets in the F3 Derby. In the 2016–17 season, McGing increasingly played back in midfield. The 2017–18 season again saw a positional shift, this time to right back.

He signed a two-year contract extension with the Mariners in January 2018.

In March 2019, it was announced that McGing would leave the Mariners, having signed with Polish Ekstraklasa side Wisła Płock. McGing left the club in June 2019, having made 12 appearances.

In June 2019, it was announced McGing would return to Australia to join new manager Robbie Fowler at the Brisbane Roar.

After one season with Brisbane, McGing signed for new local A-League club Macarthur FC for their inaugural season.

Personal life
Born in Macarthur, Sydney. McGing is the older brother of Liam McGing who plays in the League of Ireland Premier Division for Finn Harps.

Honours
Macarthur
Australia Cup: 2022

References

External links
 

1994 births
Living people
Association football defenders
Australian soccer players
Central Coast Mariners FC players
Marconi Stallions FC players
Wisła Płock players
Brisbane Roar FC players
Macarthur FC players
National Premier Leagues players
A-League Men players
Ekstraklasa players
Australian expatriate soccer players
Australian expatriate sportspeople in Poland
Expatriate footballers in Poland